Ronaldo Vanin (born 31 January 1983) is a Brazilian professional footballer who plays as a defender for Alpignano Calcio.

Career
Vanin started his playing career in Italy with Torino, as part of the team's youth system. He made his professional debut in the 2002–03 season, playing three Serie A games with his club before being sent out on loan to minor league teams Benevento and Avellino. Since then, he spent almost his whole career in the lower ranks of Italian football, including a season at recently relegated Serie B club U.S. Lecce in 2012. In 2013, he left Italy to join Slovenian club ND Gorica, on loan from Parma (due to the two clubs being in a sort of partnership by the time being).

On 9 January 2015, he returned to Italy and signed a short-term contract with Lega Pro club Arezzo.

References

External links

PrvaLiga profile 

1983 births
Living people
Brazilian footballers
Association football fullbacks
Brazilian expatriate footballers
Expatriate footballers in Italy
Serie A players
Serie B players
Serie C players
Torino F.C. players
Benevento Calcio players
Slovenian PrvaLiga players
U.S. Avellino 1912 players
U.S. Catanzaro 1929 players
A.C. Perugia Calcio players
Manfredonia Calcio players
A.S.D. Sorrento players
Parma Calcio 1913 players
Expatriate footballers in Slovenia
ND Gorica players
Footballers from São Paulo